Huldar saga is the name of a lost Icelandic saga said to have been told by Sturla Þórðarson in 1263. Though the saga is no longer extant, the account of its telling has attracted extensive commentary as a rare account of medieval Icelandic saga-performance.

Huldar saga is also one of the names of at least one post-medieval Icelandic saga in the same genre.

Sturla Þórðarson's Huldar saga

This medieval Huldar saga is mentioned in Sturlu þáttr, a short tale about Sturla Þórðarson that survives only in the version of Sturlunga saga attested in the manuscript Reykjafjarðarbók, indicating that it does not belong to the written archetype of the saga. It depicts Sturla winning the favour of King Magnus VI of Norway through his storytelling; in this, it is similar to many of the Íslendingaþættir. It is assumed that the saga was akin to the fornaldarsögur, but there is debate as to whether Sturla knew it only orally or whether it was ever written (before his time or after). It has been suggested that the eponymous Huld is identical to a character in Ynglinga saga, but this is not certain. The passage is noted as a rare account of medieval Icelandic saga-performance, composed only about thirty-five years after the event is claimed to have taken place. It also seems to witness the existence of a lost *Huldar saga. 

The context for the passage is that King Hákon IV of Norway is on campaign in Scotland. Learning that Hákon's son Magnús is now ruling in Norway, an impoverished Sturla decides he needs to ingratiate himself with the new king. He sails to Bergen, but is not received warmly by Magnús, who merely promises not to kill him. Magnús then has Sturla accompany him and the court on a voyage southwards.

The eighteenth-century Sagan af Huld hinni miklu 
The name Huldar saga is also borne by a saga first witnessed in eighteenth-century manuscripts and known as Sagan af Huld hinni miklu. Modern scholars do not believe it is related to Sturla's tale; Matthew Driscoll has indeed characterised it as 'an 18th-century reconstruction' of Sturla's tale. At least twenty-one manuscripts of the saga are known. The saga was printed in Reykjavík in 1909 as Sagan af Huld drottningu hinni ríku ('the saga of Queen Huld the Powerful') and as Sagan af Huld hinni miklu og fjölkunnugu trölldrottningu ('the saga of Huld the Great and the magical troll-queen') and published in Akureyri in 1911.

References

Further reading
 Konrad Maurer, Die Huldar Saga, Abhandlungen der Bayerischen Akademie der Wissenschaften, Philosophisch-Philologische und Historische Klasse, 20 (Munich: Franz, 1894)

Legendary sagas